Newport is a small remote village on the eastern shore of Caithness, Scottish Highlands and is in the Scottish council area of Highland.

Ramscraig lies 1 mile northeast along the A9 road coast road, with Dunbeath lying 2 miles further north. Berriedale is directly south of the village.

References

Populated places in Caithness